The Department of Transport was an Australian government department that existed between December 1972 and May 1982. It was the third so-named Australian Government Department to be established.

Scope
Information about the department's functions and/or government funding allocation could be found in the Administrative Arrangements Orders, the annual Portfolio Budget Statements and in the department's annual reports.

According to the Administrative Arrangements Order (AAO) made on 20 December 1972, the department dealt with:
Navigation and shipping
Lighthouses, lightships, beacons and buoys
Land transport

Structure
The department was an Australian Public Service department, staffed by officials who were responsible to the Minister for Transport.

References

Australia, Transport
Transport
1972 establishments in Australia
1982 disestablishments in Australia
Transport in Australia
Defunct transport organisations based in Australia